Edward Stowe Hamlin (July 6, 1808 – November 23, 1894) was a U.S. Representative from Ohio.

Life and career
Born in Hillsdale, New York, Hamlin attended the district school of Hillsdale, New York, and a private school in Stockbridge, Massachusetts. He pursued an academic course in Hudson, New York. He subsequently studied law and was admitted to the bar in 1831 and commenced practice in Elyria, Ohio. He served as prosecuting attorney of Lorain County from  1833-1835.

Hamlin was elected as a Whig to the Twenty-eighth Congress to fill the vacancy caused by the death of Henry R. Brinkerhoff and served from October 8, 1844, to March 3, 1845. He was not a candidate for renomination in 1844.

He then moved to Cleveland, Ohio, in 1844 and engaged in the newspaper business, establishing the True Democrat (now The Plain Dealer) in 1846. He served as member of the Free Soil Convention at Buffalo in 1848. He served as president of the board of public works 1849-1852.

He moved to Cincinnati, Ohio, in 1856, and was the attorney for the Cincinnati, Indianapolis & Lafayette Railroad for many years.

He moved to Williamsburg, Virginia, in 1884 to supervise his extensive land holdings at Newport News.

He died in Washington, D.C., November 23, 1894 and was interred in Cedar Grove Cemetery in Williamsburg.

References
 

1808 births
1894 deaths
People from Elyria, Ohio
Politicians from Cleveland
Politicians from Williamsburg, Virginia
Ohio Free Soilers
County district attorneys in Ohio
19th-century American newspaper publishers (people)
Editors of Ohio newspapers
Whig Party members of the United States House of Representatives from Ohio
19th-century American journalists
American male journalists
19th-century male writers
19th-century American politicians
Journalists from Virginia
Journalists from Ohio